Scythris tephrella is a moth of the family Scythrididae. It was described by Bengt Å. Bengtsson in 2005. It is found in Saudi Arabia and Yemen.

The wingspan is 12–13 mm.

Etymology
The species name refers to the pale ash-greyish colour and is derived from Greek tephra (meaning ash).

References

tephrella
Moths described in 2005